Moorella is a genus of parasitoid wasps belonging to the family Encyrtidae within the superfamilia Chalcidoidea, in the order Hymenoptera.

The following species of neotropical insects are included in this genus:
 Moorella alini Trjapitzin and Triapitsyn, 2015
 Moorella compressiventris Timberlake, 1925
 Moorella fulviceps Cameron, 1913 (type species of this genus)
 Moorella irwini Triapitsyn and Trjapitzin, 2015
 Moorella latipes Girault, 1913
 Moorella zuparkoi Triapitsyn and Trjapitzin, 2015

References

Encyrtinae